Praticolella is a genus of air-breathing land snails, terrestrial pulmonate gastropod mollusks in the family Polygyridae.

This genus comprises about 15 species of small snails with semi-globose shells.

Shell description
The shells of these snails often have contrasting color bands, and are usually without apertural teeth, although a tooth may sometimes occur on the parietal wall of the aperture.

Snails in this genus are distinguished from other polygyrid snails on the basis of their internal anatomy.

Distribution
Species of Praticolella may be found from Nicaragua and eastern Mexico, into the southeastern United States, from Texas to North Carolina.

Species 
This genus includes the following species and subspecies:

Praticolella ampla (Pfeiffer, 1866)
Praticolella bakeri Vanatta, 1915
Praticolella berlandieriana (Moricand, 1833)
Praticolella campi Clapp & Ferriss, 1919
Praticolella candida Hubricht, 1983
Praticolella griseola (Pfeiffer, 1841)
Praticolella jejuna (Say, 1821)
Praticolella lawae (Lewis, 1874)
Praticolella martensiana (Pilsbry, 1907)
Praticolella mobiliana (Lea, 1841)
Praticolella pachyloma (Menke, 1847)
Praticolella strebeliana Pilsbry, 1899
Praticolella taeniata Pilsbry, 1940
Praticolella trimatris Hubricht, 1983

References

Polygyridae